Albert College may refer to:
Albert College (Dublin), Dublin City University, Dublin
Albert Einstein College of Medicine, New York
Albert College (Belleville, Ontario)